Hossein Fekri (Persian: حسین فکری, March 15, 1924 – July 1, 2003) was an Iranian football player and coach for the Iran national football team. As an international player he won a silver medal at the 1951 Asian Games. At the club level he competed for Daraei and Shahin and then established Tehranjavan. He is third manager in the history of Persepolis, and managed football teams until he was 77 years old.

Fekri had two brothers, Hassan and Mohammad, and five sons, Saeed, Masoud, Hamid, Pirouz and Iran; Masoud played football at the national level.

Honours
Iran
Asian Games Silver medal: 1951

References

1924 births
2003 deaths
Shahin FC players
Persepolis F.C. managers
Sportspeople from Tehran
Asian Games silver medalists for Iran
Asian Games medalists in football
Footballers at the 1951 Asian Games
Medalists at the 1951 Asian Games
Tractor S.C. managers
Iranian footballers
Iran international footballers
Association football midfielders
Iranian football managers